The russet-crowned motmot (Momotus mexicanus) is a species of motmot native to north-western Mexico and central Guatemala.
It is a year-round resident of the tropical and subtropical dry broadleaf forests and scrubland. The russet-crowned motmot is the most understudied species of motmot in the family Momotidae.

"Russet" refers to the reddish-brown colour of the bird's head and originates from the Latin russus meaning red.

Taxonomy 
Motmots are a part of the order Coraciiformes which also includes bee-eaters, rollers, todies, and kingfishers. The russet-crowned motmot is one of seven species in the genus Momotus of the family Momotidae.

Russet-crowned motmots are very sedentary because of their strong site fidelity; 60% return to the same nesting areas as the previous year because of the low amount of suitable nesting sites. As a result, gene flow between different populations is limited which can lead to speciation. Reyes et al. found that genetic variation between three populations in Mexico was very high (12.9%) considering that the populations were relatively close. 

There are four recognized subspecies of russet-crowned motmots:

M.m. mexicanus
 M.m. vanrossemi
 M.m. saturates
 M.m. castaneiceps
The subspecies M.m. castaneiceps is part of a very isolated population of russet-crowned motmots only found in central Guatemala and could be considered a separate species.

Description

Morphology 

Russet-crowned motmots are relatively small motmots that measure 30.5 to 35.5 cm long and weigh 74 to 104g. Like most motmots, russet-crowned motmots are not sexually dimorphic in plumage. However, females have shorter tail feathers (10 to 15cm) than males (11 to 22cm). Russet-crowned motmots have a rufous crown and nape. They have a green back and green wings with blue-green primary feathers. Their chest is pale green with a black spot and they have an even paler underbelly. Russet-crowned motmots have a long blue tail with a bare section near the tip of the longest central feathers, which creates a dark racket-shaped tip. Their black bills have a slightly serrated edge and curve downwards. Like most motmots, russet-crowned motmots have a black eye-mask which is lined by blue & violet feathers. They have reddish eyes and grey legs and feet. Juveniles have brown eyes and duller plumage. The 4 subspecies vary in morphology; in comparison to M.m. mexicanus, M.m. vanrossemi is paler, M.m. saturates is larger and darker, and M.m. castaneiceps has a darker chestnut crown and its black eye-mask is more extensive.

Vocalization 
The russet-crowned motmot produces a low “krrp”, “krrup”, or “kru, krr-up” which is strung together, making a longer call. They can also produce a hollow “ook”. Mated pairs take part in call-and-response duets.

Distribution & Habitat 
Russet-crowned motmots prefer old-growth forests with closed canopy but they are also found in secondary forests with a lot of canopy coverage. They live in dry and humid tropical forests and clearings up to 1800m in altitude.

Russet-crowned motmots are found along the western coast of Mexico and in an isolated population in central Guatemala. They are common along their range. The subspecies M.m. vanrossemi can be observed in north-western Mexico in Sonora, Sinaloas and Chihuahua. M.m. mexicanus can be found from Sinaloa to Oaxaca along the west coast and M.m. saturates can be found in south-western Mexico and Guatemala. M.m. castaneiceps is an isolated population only found in the Motagua Valley of central Guatemala until recently. In 2018, the distribution of M.m. castaneiceps expanded to the Nentón valley in Huehuetenango which suggests that their range might be growing to western Guatemala.

Behaviour & Ecology

Diet & Foraging 
Russet-crowned motmots feeds on large invertebrates (i.e. grasshoppers, etc.), fruits, and small vertebrates (i.e. snakes, lizards, etc.). They have the typical feeding strategy of the Momotidae family known as "flycatching"; russet-crowned motmots perch on low branches and dart out to catch prey or bite fruit. They return to their perches to eat their catch and they hit their live prey against branches before swallowing it.

Reproduction 
Russet-crowned motmots are socially monogamous birds. Females and males pair up during the breeding season and they both care for the brood. Labour is equally divided between the mating pair. 

Breeding season is between May to July which is the wet season. Russet-crowned motmots tend to breed once per year. They lay one small clutch of 4-5 eggs per breeding season, which is typical for tropical birds. The incubation period is between 15 to 20 days. Both males and females feed the hatchlings and fledglings leave the nest after a total of 30 to 42 days. Russet-crowned motmots have a 68% hatching success rate and a 56% fledgling success rate. 83% of hatchlings will successfully fly out of the nest. Most of the deaths happen during incubation and the predation of the brood is primarily by snake and iguanas.

Russet-crowned motmots are burrow-nesting birds. Each mating pair digs a tunnel that is 88 to 170cm deep in an earthen, roadside, or river bank. The tunnels are horizontally flat, they can curve and they have an egg chamber. The tunnels are only for breeding but the breeding sites are multi-purpose territories that the russet-crowned motmots use for foraging, roosting, etc. These tunnels are very dependent on the quality of the substrate because they can get flooded or collapse if they are not built in a suitable area. Good nesting sites are hard to find and they are limited by soil type. Loam-textured soils which contain sand, silt and clay are the best substrates for russet-crowned motmots to nest in because they have better drainage, they are easier to excavate, and they offer better ventilation. Since suitable nesting sites are scarce, russet-crowned motmots are strongly sedentary and will return to previous nesting grounds because they already know the quality, food sources, shelters, predators, and breeding performances of that site.

Lifespan 
Charre et al. suggest that the lifespan of a russet-crowned motmot is at least 11 years. This estimate is not definitive because it is based on the recapturing of one individual 10 years later.

Territoriality 
Territory is very valuable to russet-crowned motmots because of the lack of suitable nesting areas. As a result, Russet-crowned motmots they are very territorial. However, Richard E. Tashian reported seeing russet-crowned motmots in flocks of birds including golden-fronted woodpeckers, white-throated Magpie-jay, coloured thrush, streak-backed oriole and coppery-tailed trogon in Guatemala. This suggests that russet-crowned motmots defend their territories only against individuals of their species which is called infraspecific territoriality. When there is an intruder, the russet-crowned motmot holds a leaf in its beak to display combative behaviour before chasing or fighting the intruder. This territorial behaviour is performed year-round during the breeding and non-breeding season. Both paired and unpaired males and females defend their territory. Mating pairs will react differently towards male intruders and female intruders. They are more aggressive towards a male intruder than a female intruder. When a male intruder holds a leaf, the mating pair get closer to chase or fight him. But when a female intruder holds a leaf, the mating pair holds a leaf as well to warn her.

Predator-response 
Russet-crowned motmots wave their tails side-to-side when they see a predator as an acknowledgment of their presence.

Conservation status 
Although the IUCN recognizes russet-crowned motmots of least concern for conservation, their habitats are threatened. The suitable nesting sites for russet-crowned motmots are steadily decreasing because of changing climate and human activity. Nest sites are becoming limited because of the higher amount of precipitation associated with climate change which increases the flooding and the collapse of nests. Agricultural use in the Motagua Valley, Guatemala diminishes the available nesting ground of the subspecies M.m. castaneiceps. In addition, fragmented forests increases brood parasitism and predation. The russet-crowned motmot is at risk of becoming endangered if their habitats are not conserved.

References

russet-crowned motmot
Birds of Guatemala
Birds of Mexico
russet-crowned motmot
Taxonomy articles created by Polbot
Birds of the Sierra Madre Occidental
Birds of the Sierra Madre del Sur